The Voice Cambodia (Season 1) is a Cambodian reality talent show that was aired from 3 August to 16 November 2014 on Hang Meas HDTV. Based on the reality singing competition The Voice of Holland, the series was created by Dutch television producer John de Mol. It is part of an international series.

The First Phase: The Blind Auditions

Episode 1: August 03, 2014

Episode 2: August 10, 2014

Episode 3: August 17, 2014

Episode 4: August 24, 2014

Episode 5: August 31, 2014

Episode 6: September 7, 2014

The Second Phase: The Battle

Episode 7: September 14, 2014

Episode 8: September 21, 2014

Episode 9: September 28, 2014

Episode 10: October 5, 2014

The Third Phase: Live Show

Episode 11: Week 1, October 12, 2014

Episode 12: Week 2, October 19, 2014

Episode 13: Week 3, October 26, 2014

Episode 14: Week 4, November 2, 2014

Episode 15: Week 5, Semi-Final, November 9, 2014

Episode 16: Week 6, Final, November 16, 2014 

Cambodia
2014 Cambodian television seasons